Olin Sewall Pettingill Jr.  (October 30, 1907 – December 11, 2001) was an American naturalist, author and filmmaker, president of the Wilson Ornithological Society from 1948 to 1950, a member of the board of directors of the National Audubon Society from 1955 to 1974, and a Life Fellow of the American Ornithologists' Union.

Early life
Born October 30, 1907 in Belgrade, Maine, Pettingill attended Bowdoin College, where he developed an interest in ornithology. Studying under zoologist Alfred O. Gross, Pettingill conducted studies of the last three heath hens on Martha's Vineyard in 1927 with Gross and Thornton Burgess. 

In 1928, Pettingill enrolled in the University of Michigan, then attended graduate school at Cornell University starting in 1930 – joining the AOU in the same year – where he conducted a PhD dissertation on the American woodcock.

Career
Appointed a delegate to the 12th and 14th International Ornithological Congresses, Pettingill was appointed Director of the Cornell Laboratory of Ornithology in 1960, a position he held until his retirement in 1973, and provided footage for four Walt Disney nature films, including the Academy Award-winning The Vanishing Prairie, in addition to making several ornithological films of his own, including works on albatrosses, penguins, and the wildlife of island nations, which often aired as part of Audubon Screen Tours.

Tenured at Carleton College for 17 years, Pettingill taught at the University of Michigan Biological Station for 35 years. Pettingill was awarded birding's highest honor, the Ludlow Griscom Award, in 1982, and also received Cornell's Arthur A. Allen Medal in 1974, and the Eisenmann Medal in 1985. Holding three honorary doctorates in science, Pettingill appeared on both The Today Show and To Tell the Truth.

Death
Pettingill died December 11, 2001, in Bedford, Texas, aged 94.

Works
Books
 Ornithology in Laboratory and Field, 1939 (2nd edition, 1946; 3rd edition, 1956; 4th edition, 1970; 5th edition, 1985); 2013 pbk reprint of 4th edition
 A Guide to Finding Birds East of the Mississippi, 1951
 A Guide to Finding Birds West of the Mississippi, 1953
 Enjoying Maine Birds, 1960
 Enjoying Birds in Upstate New York, 1963
 Enjoying Birds around New York City, 1966
 The Audubon Illustrated handbook of American Birds, editor-in-chief, 1968.
 The Bird Watcher's America, editor, 1974
 Another Penguin Summer, 1975
 My Way to Ornithology, 1992
Films
 Nature's Half Acre, 1951
 Water Birds, 1952
 The Vanishing Prairie, 1954
 Islands of the Sea, 1960

Notes

References

External links

  (On pages 1010–1011 Pettingill gives a list of 25 recommended books.)
 

1907 births
2001 deaths
People from Belgrade, Maine
American documentary filmmakers
American ornithological writers
American male non-fiction writers
University of Michigan alumni
Bowdoin College alumni
Cornell University alumni
Carleton College faculty
20th-century American zoologists
20th-century American male writers